Anti-Catalanism  is the collective name given to various historical trends in France, Italy, and Spain that have been hostile to Catalan culture and traditions.

Description
In a historical context, anti-Catalanism expresses itself as a hostile attitude towards the Catalan language, people, traditions or anything identified with Catalonia. In a political context it may express itself as the reaction to a perceived intrusion of Catalan political nationalism into the area. In its most extreme circumstances, this may also be referred as Catalanophobia, though it is not a phobia per se. Several political movements, known for organising boycotts of products from Catalonia, are also actively identified with anti-Catalanism.

History

Italy in the Middle Ages
Historian Antoni Simon states that between the 12th and 15th centuries, the Crown of Aragon's military expansion into Sicily, Sardinia and southern Italy and the entry of Catalan merchants into these markets generated a deep sense of hostility against the Catalans - often identified as Spaniards. Reflections can be found in the literary works of Dante Alighieri, Giovanni Boccaccio, Francesco Petrarca, Luigi Alamanni, Pietro Aretino or Serafino Aquilano.

Spain in the early modern period
In 1482, the suppression and burning of the Valencia Bible, the first Bible in the Catalan language, occurred. 

In accordance with a new decree of Philip V, which abolished Catalan laws and institutions after the War of the Spanish Succession, which ended in 1714, the marginalization of the Catalan language and culture gradually increased in favor of the Castilians. The new Plant Decree was a royal measure aimed at suppressing those who were defeated during the Inheritance War, and it initiated the creation of a Spanish centralized state in accordance with the laws of Castile, and for the first time founded the Kingdom of Spain. This centralization took quite some time during the nineteenth and early twentieth centuries, reaching maximum levels during the dictatorship of Franco and the White Terror.

Persecution of Catalan in Francoist Spain 

During the dictatorship of Franco (1939-1975), not only democratic freedoms were suppressed, but also the Catalan language, which was excluded from the education system and relegated to the family sphere. Castillian (Spanish) became the only language of education, administration and the media.

Rafael Aracil, Joan Oliver and Antoni Segura considered that until 1951, the persecution of the language was "total". In some places students had to denounce fellow students who spoke Catalan. During this period, The Catalan language was also prohibited on tombstones.

With the defeat of Nazi Germany in 1945, the regime changed their image, which allowed the Orfeó Català to put on Catalan productions, and the publication of Catalan books, though only classic works; works aimed at young people were prohibited to limit the learning of the written language.  Among these authors were those who returned from exile in 1942–1943. Their works include a Catalan translation of the Odyssey (1948) by Carles Riba, and research conducted by teacher Alexandre Galí with Història de les Institucions 1900-1936 (History of Institutions), which even today are reference works.

Later on, opening of the regime allowed a small change in the marginalization of the language, such as the broadcast in 1964 of the first Catalan television program on TVE (Teatre català), the Nova Cançó (New Song) (1961) movement,  and the creation in 1971 of the Assembly of Catalonia, in which anti-Francoist forces were clustered, all maintained the use of Catalan, though there were limits such as the ban on Joan Manuel Serrat singing in Catalan at the Eurovision Song Contest in 1968. In 1970, Franco's education law opened the door to the use of different languages in primary education, with another decree following in 1975. Also in 1975, near Franco's death, another decree allowed the use of other native Spanish languages in councils.

In the 21st century, some organizations and fake news blogs such as Dolça Catalunya, closely linked to the Spanish far-right and the ultra-Catholicism, have maintained and become a vehicle of anti-Catalanism and language secessionism.

See also
 Black legend
 Lerrouxism
 Polaco (slur)
 State nation

References

Bibliography